The Nevada Department of Transportation (Nevada DOT or NDOT) is a government agency in the U.S. state of Nevada. NDOT is responsible for maintaining and improving Nevada's highway system, which includes U.S. highways and Interstate highways within the state's boundaries.  The department is notable for its aggressively proactive approach to highway maintenance. Nevada state roads and bridges have also been named some of the nation's best.

The state of Nevada is facing a multibillion-dollar transportation funding deficit, and NDOT is developing potential transportation funding sources through the Pioneer Program and Vehicle Miles Traveled Fee Study.

For those driving in Nevada, NDOT offers updated road conditions and construction reports through the 511 Nevada Travel Info system. NDOT headquarters is located on Stewart Street (former State Route 520) in Carson City, Nevada.

History 
Although the department has existed since 1917 as the Department of Highways, its current structure was only established in 1979. The department served as a section of the Department of Agriculture from 1893 to 1917, when it finally became a separate entity. True to its name, the Department of Highways has focused mostly on creating roads that can accommodate automobiles since its year of inception. It was also involved in the construction of the Hoover Dam. When the current model of the department was created in 1979, the division had four divisions: administrative division, operations division, engineering division, and planning division, which are similarly structured as its current form. But it did not yet have a Chief Engineer role, which exists in its present organization structure.

In 2019, NDOT started to transfer roads to local municipalities in southern nevada

Divisions 
The current Department of Transportation supervises five divisions, which are the following:

Administration Division 
The division consists of the following sub-divisions: accounting, administrative services, civil rights/disadvantaged business enterprises, communications, financial forecasting, financial management, flight operations, and information technology.

Engineering Division 
These subdivisions fall under the purveyor of the Engineering Division: design, environmental program, location, project management, right of way, and structure.

Operations Division 
There are six subdivisions within the Operations Division: construction, equipment, maintenance and asset management, materials, geotechnical, and traffic operations.

Planning Division 
The division has the largest number of subdivisions in comparison to the others, which are: aviation, bicycle and pedestrian, Connecting Nevada, freight, performance analysis, public transit, rail, research, roadway systems, traffic safety engineering, traffic information, and transportation planning.

Stormwater Program Division 
The four subdivisions that make up the Stormwater Program Division are:

 Report an Illicit Discharge
 MS4 Permit
 Mapping Inventory
 Training

See also
 List of Nevada state highways
List of Nevada state agencies
U.S. Department of Transportation

References

External links
 
 Nevada Department of Transportation - Road Conditions

1917 establishments in Nevada
Government agencies established in 1917
State agencies of Nevada
State departments of transportation of the United States